William John Thoms (16 November 1803 – 15 August 1885) was a British writer credited with coining the term "folklore" in 1846.  Thoms's investigation of folklore and myth led to a later career of debunking longevity myths, and he was a pioneer demographer.

Life
He was born on 16 November 1803.

Thoms worked as an antiquary, and miscellaneous writer, for many years a clerk in the secretary's office of Chelsea Hospital. He was made a fellow of the Society of Antiquaries and became secretary to the Camden Society in 1838.  In 1845, he was appointed Clerk to the House of Lords, and subsequently Deputy Librarian at the House of Lords Library.  In 1849, he founded
the quarterly journal Notes and Queries, which for some years he also edited.

Thoms is credited with inventing the term "folklore" in an 1846 letter to the Athenaeum.  He invented this compound word to replace the various other terms used at the time, including "popular antiquities" or "popular literature".  He was fond of the works of Jacob Grimm, which he considered remarkable.

His first book, Early Prose Romances (3 vol. 1827-1828), was published with encouragement from Francis Douce, and gave versions of English tales such as "Robert the Devyl, Thomas a Reading, Friar Bacon, Friar Rush, Virgilius, Robin Hood, George a Green, Tom a Lincolne, Helyas, and Dr. Faustus".
Among his publications are  Lays and Legends (1834), The Book of the Court (1838), Gammer Gurton's Famous Histories (1846), Gammer Gurton's Pleasant Stories (1848).  He also edited Stow's Survey of London in 1842.
Thoms was a leading member of the Folklore Society, founded in 1878, though his involvement in its establishment is poorly investigated.

In the 1870s, William Thoms began investigating claims to "ultra-centenarianism." He is credited with first formulating the concept that claims of very old age are typically exaggerated. His book Human Longevity: Its Facts and Fictions (1873) laid down some rules for validating longevity claims.

Thoms died on 15 August 1885 and is buried in Brompton Cemetery, London.

Works
Thoms is associated with many publications, as editor, compiler or author. He used the pseudonym Ambrose Merton for several works.
He began a column titled Folk-Lore in Charles Wentworth Dilke's Athenaeum in 1846. The same publisher encouraged him to begin Notes and Queries and was editor of this until 1872. His early attempt to produce a collection of folk tales, advertised as "Folk-Lore of England", did not appear, but his later antiquarian publications sometimes reprinted his articles and material from subscribers.

The following is an incomplete list of works:
 The Book of the Court, 1838
 Anecdotes and Traditions illustrative of Early English History and Literature from Manuscript Sources, Camden Society 1839.
 Stow's Survey of London (London, 8vo), 1842 ed.
 In  he prepared for the Early English Poetry series (Percy Society) The History of Reynard the Fox, 1844, (Caxton in 1481)
 Gammer Gurton's Famous Histories of Sir Guy of Warwick, Sir Bevis of Hampton, Tom Hickathrift, Friar Bacon, Robin Hood, and the King and the Cobbler (Westminster, 16mo)
 Gammer Gurton's Pleasant Stories of Patient Grissel, the Princess Rosetta, and Robin Goodfellow, and ballads of the Beggar's Daughter, the Babes in the Wood, and Fair Rosamond (Westminster, 16mo).
 Primeval Antiquities of Denmark London, 1849. translating Jens Jacob Asmussen Worsaae.
Human Longevity, its Facts and its Fictions, including an inquiry into some of the more remarkable instances, and suggestions for testing reputed cases, illustrated by examples. London: J. Murray, 1873.
 The Longevity of Man. Its Facts and Its Fictions. With a prefatory letter to Prof. Owen, C.B., F.R.S. on the limits and frequency of exceptional cases. London: F. Norgate, 1879.

See also
 Longevity claims
 Longevity myths
 Supercentenarian

References

External links
 

 
 Intro to folklore
 The old story books of England, 1845
 Roper, Jonathan (2007). "Thoms and the Unachieved "Folk-Lore of England"". Folklore. 118 (2): 203–216. doi:10.1080/00155870701340035. ISSN 0015-587X. S2CID 161251619.

Attribution

1803 births
1885 deaths
English folklorists
Burials at Brompton Cemetery
Fellows of the Society of Antiquaries of London
Folklorists